Andrée A. Michaud (born November 12, 1957) is a Canadian novelist and playwright from Quebec. She is a two-time winner of the Governor General's Award for French-language fiction, for Le ravissement at the 2001 Governor General's Awards and for Bondrée at the 2014 Governor General's Awards, and won the Prix Ringuet in 2007 for Mirror Lake. Boundary, translated by Donald Winkler, has been longlisted for the 2017 Scotiabank Giller Prize.

She is a graduate of the Université du Québec à Montréal. In addition to her published novels, she has also written the plays Un paysage / Eine Landshaft / A Landscape and Cette petite chose for Quebec's Productions Recto-Verso theatre company.

Works
 La femme de Sath (1987)
 Portraits d'après modèles (1991)
 Alias Charlie (1994)
 Les derniers jours de Noah Eisenbaum (1998)
 Le ravissement (2001)
 Le Pendu de Trempes (2004)
 Mirror Lake (2006)
 Lazy Bird (2010)
 Rivière Tremblante (2011)
 Bondrée (2013)
Translation: Boundary: the Last Summer (2017)Routes secondaires (2017)
Translation: Back Roads'' (2020)

References

1957 births
Living people
Canadian women novelists
Canadian women dramatists and playwrights
20th-century Canadian novelists
21st-century Canadian novelists
21st-century Canadian dramatists and playwrights
Governor General's Award-winning fiction writers
Writers from Quebec
People from Estrie
Canadian novelists in French
Canadian dramatists and playwrights in French
20th-century Canadian women writers
21st-century Canadian women writers
Université Laval alumni